Katherine B. Johnson (born March 26, 1981)  served as the personal secretary to United States President Barack Obama from 2009 to 2011.

Personal life
Johnson grew up in Bethesda, Maryland, and moved with her parents to Brookline, Massachusetts, in 1999 before entering Wellesley College. She is the oldest of three children of Dr. Bruce E. Johnson, head of thoracic oncology at Dana–Farber Cancer Institute, and Georgia M. Johnson, a management consultant and an elected Town Meeting member in Brookline.

Johnson graduated from Wellesley College in 2003 with a Bachelor of Arts degree in political science. Prior to her post as personal secretary to the president, Johnson was Rahm Emanuel's special assistant for two years when he led the Democratic Congressional Campaign Committee, and also served as Barack Obama campaign manager David Plouffe's assistant.

Johnson was one of several junior staffers who left the White House in 2011 to attend Harvard Law School. Her last day as secretary was June 10, 2011.

Post-secretarial career
Johnson returned to the White House as a Counselor in the Office of Management and Budget. She is currently a partner in the Washington, D.C. office of Chicago-based law firm Jenner & Block.

Gallery

References

External links

Mass. 20-something gets White House gig, Brian C. Mooney, Boston Globe, January 13, 2009
From Wellesley to organizer in chief, Brian C. Mooney, Boston Globe, January 14, 2009

1981 births
Harvard Law School alumni
Living people
Massachusetts Democrats
People from Bethesda, Maryland
People from Brookline, Massachusetts
Personal secretaries to the President of the United States
Obama administration personnel
Wellesley College alumni